Lawrence Gordon Clark, is an English television director and producer, perhaps best known for his A Ghost Story for Christmas series of mostly M. R. James ghost stories, which were broadcast annually by the BBC throughout the 1970s.

These are:
The Stalls of Barchester (1971)
A Warning to the Curious (1972) 
Lost Hearts (1973)
 The Treasure of Abbot Thomas (1974) 
The Ash Tree (1975)
The Signalman (1976)
Stigma (1977)

He also directed two other ghost stories: Casting The Runes, an adaptation of James' Casting the Runes in 1979 for Yorkshire Television, and an adaptation of K. M. Peyton's 1972 novel A Pattern of Roses in 1983, which was the acting debut of Helena Bonham-Carter. Elsewhere, Clark has directed four episodes of the 1979 series Flambards, which starred Christine McKenna, and later went on to be a director of continuing dramas for BBC One including Casualty, Pie in the Sky and Dangerfield.

In the 1980s he directed every episode of the television series Harry's Game (1982) and Jamaica Inn (1983), and in the 1990s two spy films in the Frederick Forsyth Presents series, as well as two more spy firms based on Jack Higgins's novels - Midnight Man (1996) and On Dangerous Ground (1997).

A collection of Clark's original short stories entitled Telling Stories was published late 2011 by Avalard Publishing.

References

External links

British television directors
Living people
Year of birth missing (living people)